Silver Creek is an unincorporated community in Lewis County, Washington, United States. Lake Mayfield is accessible 3.5 miles to the east.

A post office called Silver Creek has been in operation since 1875. The community takes its name from nearby Silver Creek.

Government and politics

Politics

Silver Creek is recognized as being majority Republican and conservative, similar to most of rural Lewis County. 

The results for the 2020 U.S. Presidential Election for the Winlock voting district were as follows:

 Donald J. Trump (Republican) - 498 (68.98%)
 Joe Biden (Democrat) - 210 (29.09%)
 Jo Jorgensen (Libertarian) - 10 (1.39%)
 Write-in candidate - 3 (0.42%)

References

Populated places in Lewis County, Washington
Unincorporated communities in Lewis County, Washington
Unincorporated communities in Washington (state)